Beit 'Anan is a Palestinian village in the Quds Governorate, located northwest of Jerusalem. In 2010, it had a population of 4,982. Some residents of Beit 'Anan hold Israeli identity cards, while others hold Palestinian identity cards.

History
In 1159, Bethanam is mentioned in Crusader sources in connection with defining the borders between it and Parva Mahomeria.

In 1883, Survey of Western Palestine  suggested that Beit 'Anan was identical with the Crusader village of Beithumen,  a fief of the Holy Sepulchre in the twelfth  century. However, in 1887  Röhricht  thought it was a more likely that  Beitunia was Beithumen, and in 1890 Conder agreed fully with  Röhricht.

Ottoman era
Beit 'Anan was incorporated into the Ottoman Empire in 1517 with all of Palestine, and in 1596 it appeared in the  tax registers as being in the Nahiya of  Quds of the Liwa of Quds. It had a population of 28 households, all Muslim, who paid a fixed tax sum of 3,400 akçe.

Around 1740 Richard Pococke noted Beit 'Anan after travelling from Nabi Samwil.

In 1838 it was noted as a Muslim village, located in the Beni Malik area, west of Jerusalem.

In 1863 Victor Guérin visited the village, and  estimated that it had 600 inhabitants, while an official Ottoman village list of about 1870 showed that "Bet 'Anan" had 59 houses and a population of 220, though the population count included only men. In 1883, the PEF's Survey of Western Palestine (SWP) described the village as "a small village on top of a flat ridge; near a main road to the west are remains of a Khan with water, and about a mile to the east is a spring."

In 1896 the population of Beit 'Anan was estimated to be about 450  persons.

British Mandate era
Beit 'Anan was captured by British forces in the 1917 Battle for Jerusalem during their campaign in Palestine against the Ottomans. It was described as a village situated on the hill commanding Dukka from the south, on the road to Kubeibeh, identified as ancient Emmaus.

In the 1922 census of Palestine conducted by the British Mandate authorities, "Bait 'Inan" had a population of 509 Muslims,  increasing in the 1931 census to a population of 654 Muslims, in 162 houses.

In the 1945 statistics  Beit I'nan had a population of 820, all Muslims, with 10,105  dunams of land, according to an official land and population survey. Of this, 2,015 dunams were plantations and irrigable land, 2,471 used for cereals, while 63 dunams were built-up (urban) land.

Jordanian era

In the wake of the 1948 Arab–Israeli War, and after the 1949 Armistice Agreements, Beit 'Anan  came under Jordanian rule. It was annexed by Jordan in 1950.

In 1961, the population of Beit I'nan was  1,255.

Post-1967
Since the Six-Day War in 1967, Beit 'Anan has been under Israeli occupation. The population of Beit Inan in the 1967 census conducted by the Israeli authorities was 1,261, of whom 212 originated from the Israeli territory.

After the 1995 accords, about 12.9% of the land (or 1,309 dunams) was classified as Area B, and the remaining 87.1% (or 8,797 dunams) as Area C.

The Israeli plans for the Separation Wall will isolate a total of 1,009 dunams of village land on, or behind the wall, out of reach for its Palestinian owners.

In 2012 the Beit Anan population was near five thousand with four thousand more migrants and their descendants. There are nearly 2,000 living in Jordan, most in Zarqa. More than 2,000 live in the United States, most of whom live in the Paterson, New Jersey area. Others live in Louisiana, Illinois, Ohio, and Florida, with a few living in Michigan. Some of their descendants live in Brazil. Migration from Beit Anan began in the early fifties. Then, nearly all headed to Brazil via the sea. Since the late sixties and until today migration from Beit Anan has been nearly entirely to the United States.

Education and culture
Beit 'Anan has an UNRWA school for girls with 560 students, two elementary schools for boys and three kindergartens. The Abu Ayob al-Ansary mosque is located in Beit 'Anan. The village has two health clinics  and several sports clubs. In 2009, a four-day culture festival was held in Beit Anan and was attended by more than 15,000 people.

Biddu enclave
Beit 'Anan along with Biddu, Beit Duqqu, Beit Surik, Qatanna, al Qubeida, Beit Ijza, Kharayib Umm al Lahim and at Tira form the "Biddu enclave." The enclave will be linked to Ramallah by underpasses and a fenced road.

West Bank barrier
In July 2004, the Israeli High Court of Justice cancelled military orders for the confiscation of hundreds of dunams of village land to build the separation barrier. The barrier would have passed close to Beit 'Anan and cut off the village from a lot of its land. Following the ruling, the barrier was rerouted at a greater distance from the village.

References

Bibliography

External links
Beit 'Anan website (Arabic)
 Welcome To Bayt I'nan
Survey of Western Palestine, Map 17:    IAA, Wikimedia commons
Beit 'Anan Town (Fact Sheet),   Applied Research Institute–Jerusalem (ARIJ)
Beit 'Anan Town Profile, ARIJ
Beit 'Anan  aerial photo, ARIJ
Locality Development Priorities and Needs in Beit 'Anan, ARIJ

Villages in the West Bank
Jerusalem Governorate
Municipalities of the State of Palestine